The 54th Writers Guild of America Awards honored the best writing in film, television and radio of 2001. Nominees for television and radio were announced on January 16, 2002, while nominees for film were announced on February 7, 2002. Winners were announced on March 2, 2002 in joint ceremonies at the Beverly Hilton Hotel in Beverly Hills, California and at The Pierre Hotel in New York City, New York. The ceremonies were hosted by Jeffrey Ross (Beverly Hilton) and Mort Sahl (The Pierre).

Winners and nominees

Notes
 Nominees for television and radio were originally broadcast between September 1, 2000 and August 31, 2001.
 Winners are in bold (some categories resulted in a tie, allowing two winners for some awards).

Film

Television

Documentary

News

Radio

Promotional Writing

Special Awards

References

2001
2001 film awards
2001 television awards
2001 awards in the United States
2001 guild awards
2001 in American cinema
2001 in American television
March 2002 events in the United States